Pavel Silyagin (born 13 August 1993) is a Russian professional boxer who held the WBC Silver super-middleweight. As of December 2022, he is ranked as the world's seventh best active super middleweight by the Transnational Boxing Rankings Board and ninth by BoxRec.

Professional career 
Silyagin made his professional debut on 1 February 2022, winning a sixth-round unanimous decision over Bartlomiej Grafka at the Yantarny Sports Palace in Kaliningrad.

Professional boxing record

References

External links 

 

Living people
Russian male boxers
1993 births
Super-middleweight boxers